Lomatium latilobum is a species of flowering plant in the carrot family known by the common names Canyonlands lomatium and Canyonlands biscuitroot. It is native to an area straddling the border between Utah and Colorado in the United States, where several of its few occurrences are within Arches National Park and Colorado National Monument.

This perennial herb grows 10 to 30 centimeters tall from a caudex covered in the withered remains of previous seasons' leaves. The leaves are divided into a few pairs of lance-shaped or oval leaflets up to 1.2 centimeters wide. The inflorescence is an umbel of many tiny yellow flowers. Blooming occurs in April through June. The plant has a strong scent reminiscent of lemon and licorice.

This plant grows in sandy crevices in Navajo Sandstone and other sandstones. The habitat is pinyon-juniper woodland, desert scrub, and other types of plant communities.

There are an estimated 12 to 17 occurrences of this plant, but some are based on historical collections which might not be extant. Some are officially protected within national park and national monument territory, but still face threats from people engaging in recreational activity such as hiking; the plants do not tolerate disturbance and are easily uprooted.

References

External links
Lomatium latilobum in Arches National Park.

latilobum
Flora of Colorado
Flora of Utah
Flora of the Colorado Plateau and Canyonlands region
Endemic flora of the United States
Taxa named by Mildred Esther Mathias
Plants described in 1937